Let's Make Sure We Kiss Goodbye is the ninth studio album from American country music artist Vince Gill. It was released in 2000 on MCA Nashville. It features the singles "Let's Make Sure We Kiss Goodbye," "Feels Like Love" and "Shoot Straight from Your Heart."

Track listing

Personnel 
Musicians
 Vince Gill – lead vocals, backing vocals, acoustic guitar, electric guitar, gut-string guitar, banjo, mandolin
 Steve Nathan – keyboards, acoustic piano
 Michael Omartian – keyboards, acoustic piano
 George Marinelli – electric guitar, mandolin
 Brent Mason – acoustic guitar, electric guitar, gut-string guitar 
 Randy Scruggs – acoustic guitar, gut-string guitar 
 Willie Weeks – bass guitar
 John Hammond – drums, percussion loops
 Mickey Raphael – harmonica
 Jim Horn – saxophones 
 Barry Green – trombone 
 Mike Haynes – trumpet 
 Andrea Zonn – fiddle, viola, backing vocals
 Bob Bailey – backing vocals
 Bekka Bramlett – backing vocals
 Beth Nielson Chapman – backing vocals
 Kim Fleming – backing vocals
 Thom Flora – backing vocals
 Jenny Gill – harmony vocals (11)
 Amy Grant – lead vocals (5)
 Vicki Hampton – backing vocals
 The Katinas – backing vocals
 Leslie Satcher – backing vocals
 Billy Thomas – backing vocals
 Jeff White – backing vocals

Production
 Tony Brown – producer
 Steve Marcantonio – recording (1-11), overdubbing, mixing
 Rob Charles – recording (12)
 Drew Bollman – additional recording (1-11)
 Tim Waters – recording assistant (1-11)
 Chad Brown – mix assistant 
 Denny Purcell – mastering
 Benny Garcia – guitar technician
 Jessie Noble – project coordinator 
 Bill Tyler – cover art concept 
 Jerry Joyner – design 
 Jim McGuire – photography 
 Carol Maxwell – groomer
 Trish Townsend – stylist 

Studios 
 Recorded at The Sound Kitchen (Franklin, TN).
 Overdubbed at The Sound Kitchen and Emerald Sound Studios (Nashville, TN).
 Mixed at The Sound Kitchen and Ocean Way (Nashville, TN)
 Mastered at Georgetown Masters (Nashville, TN).

Chart performance

2000 albums
Vince Gill albums
MCA Records albums
Albums produced by Tony Brown (record producer)